NDCP could either mean:

 National Defense College of the Philippines, an educational, training, and research agency under the Department of National Defense of the government of the Philippines.
 Network Device Control Protocol
 NDC Partnership or National Determinded Contributions Partnership under the Paris Climate Agreement